James Dens Maia da Silva  (born 14 August 1986 in Curitiba), known as James Dens, is a Brazilian  football agent and former defender who last played for Rio Branco Sport Club.

Club career

James Dens passed through the youth systems of his hometown clubs Paraná Clube and Coritiba, starting his professional career at the latter. In 2007, he joined Villa Nova, only to return to the Serié A by signing for Juventude later in the year, breaking into the first team and making 9 appearances. He spent 2008 in the Serié C club J. Malucelli, before moving to Europe, signing a four-year deal with Slavia Prague in February 2009. He struggled to make the first team during his year and a half there, and only made four competitive appearances throughout his time at the club. His contract was terminated in July 2010, and he returned to the lowly Aparecida Futebol Clube, but stayed there only two weeks before being recalled to Europe and signing for the Croatian side NK Zagreb. There he was a constant starter and had a good season, but refused to sign an extension of his contract, moving, in the summer of 2011, to division giants Hajduk Split on a free transfer.

After stints in Croatia and Cyprus, he returned home to Brazil, to play for Rio Branco Sport Club. After several matches for the club, plagued by an injured knee, he had to undertake surgery, but was unable to return to professional football afterwards, retiring officially in July 2015. Afterwards, he started working as an agent.

References

 Guardian Football
 James Dens at playmakerstats.com (English version of ogol.com.br)
 slavia.cz
 
 

1986 births
Living people
Footballers from Curitiba
Brazilian footballers
Association football defenders
Villa Nova Atlético Clube players
Coritiba Foot Ball Club players
Esporte Clube Juventude players
SK Slavia Prague players
NK Zagreb players
HNK Hajduk Split players
Alki Larnaca FC players
Rio Branco Sport Club players
Czech First League players
Croatian Football League players
Cypriot First Division players
Expatriate footballers in the Czech Republic
Expatriate footballers in Croatia
Expatriate footballers in Cyprus
Brazilian expatriate footballers
Association football agents